Zachariah Ralph is an American politician who served in the Vermont House of Representatives from 2019 to 2021.

References

Living people
21st-century American politicians
Members of the Vermont House of Representatives
Vermont Progressive Party politicians
Year of birth missing (living people)
People from Woodstock, Vermont